Image space may refer to:

 Image space - the optical space coordinatizing the visual representation or component of a scene
 Image (mathematics) - the set of results of a function, the output object of a morphism